Ayden may refer to:

Places
Ayden, North Carolina
Ayden Historic District
Ayden-Grifton High School

People
Ayden Callaghan, Irish-English actor
Ayden Duffy, English association footballer 
Ayden Faal, English rugby league footballer
Ayden Johnstone, New Zealand rugby union player
Ayden Owens-Delerme, Puerto Rican athlete

See also
Adyen, a Dutch payment company